Frasera tubulosa (syn. Swertia tubulosa) is a species of flowering plant in the gentian family known by the common name Kern frasera.

Distribution
The gentian is endemic to California, where it is known only from the southern Sierra Nevada, primarily within the Sequoia National Forest and Sequoia National Park.

The plant grows in open mountain areas, and in foothill chaparral and woodlands habitats.

Description
Frasera tubulosa  Frasera tubulosa is a perennial herb growing just a few centimeters tall to about a meter in maximum height. The pointed, lance-shaped basal leaves are up to 9 centimeters long. They are green with white margins, and they tend to have downcurved tips. Smaller leaves are arranged in whorls higher on the stem.

The inflorescence is an open panicle of flowers atop the stem. Each flower has a calyx of four pointed sepals and a bell-shaped corolla of four pointed lobes each roughly a centimeter long. The corolla is white or blue-tinged with light blue veining. There are four stamens tipped with large anthers and a central ovary.

References

External links
Jepson Manual Treatment: Frasera tubulosa
Frasera tubulosa — Photo gallery

tubulosa
Endemic flora of California
Flora of the Sierra Nevada (United States)
Natural history of the California chaparral and woodlands
Natural history of Kern County, California
Natural history of Tulare County, California
~
~
Flora without expected TNC conservation status